Zaninelli is a surname. Notable people with the surname include:

Luigi Zaninelli (born 1932), Italian-American composer
Marco Zaninelli (born 1977), Italian footballer
Sergio Zaninelli (born 1929), Italian academic
Silvio Zaninelli (1913–1979), American football player